The 1958 VMI Keydets football team  was an American football team that represented the Virginia Military Institute (VMI) as a member of the Southern Conference (SoCon) during the 1958 NCAA University Division football season. Led by sixth-year head coach John McKenna, the Keydets compiled an overall record of 6–2–2 with a mark of 2–2–1 in conference play, placing fourth in the SoCon.

Schedule

Roster
 Art Brandiff halfback
 John Engels halfback
 Dick Evans end
 Sam Horner halfback
 Pete Johnson fullback
 Carl Kasko end
 Bill Nebraska quarterback

References

External links
 1958 VMI Football Facts

VMI
VMI Keydets football seasons
VMI Keydets football